Radha Rani Amber Indigo Ananda Mitchell is an Australian actress. She started her career with various appearances on Australian television, including a regular role as Catherine O'Brien in the soap opera Neighbours (1996–97).

Mitchell later transitioned to working in Hollywood, with leading and supporting roles in films such as High Art (1998), Pitch Black (2000), Phone Booth (2002), Man on Fire (2004), Finding Neverland (2004), Melinda and Melinda (2004), Mozart and the Whale (2005), Silent Hill (2006), Rogue (2007), The Crazies (2010), The Frozen Ground (2013), Olympus Has Fallen (2013) and its sequel London Has Fallen (2016), The Darkness (2016), and Run Hide Fight (2020).

Early life
Mitchell's first name, Radha (Sanskrit: राधा), is the name of a Hindu goddess. Two other parts of her name—Rani (रानी, "queen") and Ananda (आनन्द, "joy")—also have Sanskrit origins. She credits her name as being a result of her mother's experiences in India during the 1970s and her fascination with Indian philosophies. She grew up just around the corner from the Como Centre, on Chapel Street, where her mother ran a shop. Mitchell attended St Michael's Grammar School in St Kilda. Her first credited screen role was that of an eleven-year-old girl from the Australian bush sent to live with her grandmother, on the ABC TV children's television series Sugar and Spice, which was broadcast between 1988 and 1989. Her experience in the series, along with the drama course she took at St Michael's, sparked her interest in acting. She then enrolled at Swinburne University of Technology, with the idea of becoming a psychologist. "I thought it was going to be group therapy, that we would go in there and talk about life and people and stuff like that. But it was all rats and stats. I didn't last beyond the first year." Instead, she obtained her Bachelor of Arts in literature and media studies.

Career

1990s
Mitchell played a recurring character in the sitcom All Together Now (1992–1993) and guest-starred in Phoenix (1993), Law of the Land (1993) and Blue Heelers (1994–96). After obtaining a ten-episode arc as a parachute instructor in Neighbours in 1994, Mitchell returned to play the regular role of Catherine O'Brien, a strong-minded and opinionated student, from 1996 to 1997. The series brought the actress to a wider exposure from audiences.

Mitchell quickly "established herself as a versatile and accomplished fixture on the moody art-house flick circuit". As noted by The Guardian, she launched "her assault on the indie scene by 'cornering the market on the lesbian ingenue'". Her film debut came in the role of a gay University of Melbourne film student in the romantic comedy Love and Other Catastrophes (1996), which grossed US$1.6 million at the Australian box office. It was her next project, Lisa Cholodenko's Independent Spirit Award winning independent drama High Art (1998), alongside Ally Sheedy, that gave Mitchell her first impression on American audiences. She was acclaimed for her performance of a young female intern at a magazine company who becomes involved with a drug-addicted lesbian photographer. Roger Ebert wrote that "High Art is so perceptive and mature it makes similar films seem flippant. The performances are on just the right note, scene after scene, for what needs to be done ...". IndieWire listed it as #7 of "The 15 Greatest Lesbian Movies of All Time", while Autostraddle listed it as #31 of "100 Best Lesbian Movies Of All Time" in 2015. She played one half of a house sitting couple in the psychological drama Cleopatra's Second Husband (also 1998).

In 1999, Mitchell starred as the former girlfriend of a lesbian make-up artist in the short drama Sleeping Beauties and as the pampered, bratty girlfriend of a champion rugby player in the drama Kick. While Sleeping Beauties premiered at the 1998 Sundance Film Festival and went on to play at over thirty film festivals, Kick had a brief cinema screening in Europe before it was released on DVD.

2000s
Mitchell was cast as Carolyn Fry, a docking pilot, in the science fiction horror film Pitch Black (2000), opposite Vin Diesel. She found the experience of acting in a studio film "physically challenging", but was eager to take on the role, explaining: "Well, it's an interesting script, great character, shot in Australia, get to go home, you know, a whole range of reasons. And because I guess it's not something I would often have the opportunity to do; it's a genre piece and I felt it was an opportunity to learn". Despite mixed reviews from critics, the film was a sleeper hit, grossing over US$53 million worldwide and developing its own cult following. In 2000, she also starred as an expecting mother in the psychological drama Everything Put Together, which was nominated for the Grand Jury Prize at the Sundance Film Festival, and as the love interest of a lawyer in the romantic comedy Cowboys and Angels.

In 2001, Mitchell played a woman giving  monologues to camera in the drama Ten Tiny Love Stories, a diner waitress in the comedy Nobody's Baby and the owner of a remote roadside diner in the thriller When Strangers Appear. Her next film release was the crime drama Dead Heat (2002), in which she played the wife of a police officer. Joel Schumacher's thriller Phone Booth (2003), opposite Colin Farrell, featured her as the wife of a young arrogant publicist who becomes a victim of a mysterious caller who threatens to harm him. It was a critical and commercial success, grossing US$97.8 million worldwide. She starred as the first woman to sail around the world solo in the horror film Visitors (also 2003).

Her three 2004 film releases —Man on Fire (2004), with Denzel Washington, the Academy Award–winning Finding Neverland, with Johnny Depp and Kate Winslet, and Woody Allen's Melinda and Melinda—  were well received by critics and successful at the box office. In Man on Fire, she played the mother of a nine-year-old abducted in Mexico City and what Houston Chronicle described as an "American trophy wife with a Southern accent that seems to come and go". Finding Neverland featured her as Mary Ansell, the wife of novelist J.M. Barrie, and earned her, as a member of the cast, a Screen Actors Guild Award nomination for Outstanding Cast in a Motion Picture. Melinda and Melinda starred her as the title role of a woman attempting to straighten out her life. Man on Fire made US$130.2 million, Finding Neverland $116.8 million, and Melinda and Melinda US$20 million in limited markets.

In Mozart and the Whale (2005), a romantic dramedy with Josh Hartnett, Mitchell played a woman with Asperger syndrome. In its review for the film, Variety noted: "Mitchell socks over her role as a dynamo whose emotional insecurity is buried under a fabulously attractive exterior; by virtue of her character’s assertiveness, she dominates the screen".

In Silent Hill (2006), the adaptation of Konami's 1999 video game of the same name, Mitchell portrayed Rose Da Silva, the desperate mother who seeks a cure for her daughter Sharon's nightmarish sleepwalking by taking her to the town of Silent Hill. James Berardinelli noted: "Radha Mitchell normally does smaller movies, but her experience from Pitch Black serves her well here; she's credible as a mother who will fight off hoards of dead to save her daughter". Despite mixed reviews, the film opened with top numbers at the box office, with over US$20 million in sales. It eventually made US$97 million globally. In 2006, she also appeared as the adoring wife of a nuclear reprocessing facility worker in the HBO film Pu-239.

In 2007, Mitchell starred in Robert Benton's romantic dramedy Feast of Love, opposite Greg Kinnear and Morgan Freeman, as a  successful realtor carrying on an affair with a married man, and in the horror film Rogue, with Michael Vartan, as a wildlife researcher fighting a giant, man-eating crocodile. Both Feast of Love and Rogue made about US$5 million worldwide. In 2008, she took on the roles of a mother to a mute seven-year old in the dramedy Henry Poole Is Here opposite Luke Wilson, and that of a courageous nurse assisting British journalist George Hogg in the historical war drama The Children of Huang Shi opposite Jonathan Rhys-Meyers. In 2009, she played a woman kidnapped by the Russian mafia in the heist action film Thick as Thieves, which reunited her with Morgan Freeman, and also an FBI agent in the sci-fi thriller Surrogates, a film adaptation of the comic book of the same name co-starring Bruce Willis.

2010s
The horror film The Crazies (2010) featured Mitchell as a pregnant woman and one of the residents of a fictional Iowa town that becomes afflicted by a military virus that turns those infected into violent killers. The film garnered positive reviews and, with a worldwide gross of US$55 million, it emerged as a moderate commercial success. In 2010, she also starred as a successful, self-starting lawyer and one half of a couple trying to adopt a child in Claire McCarthy's drama The Waiting City, which was acclaimed by critics. The Sydney Morning Herald asserted: "Featuring standout performances from Mitchell and Edgerton, this is an example of what Australian films can and should be, thought provoking, entertaining and stunning to behold". For her role, Mitchell won as Best Actress at the Antipodes Film Festival in Saint Tropez, France.

Mitchell reprised her role of Rose Da Silva in Silent Hill: Revelation (2012), which was a moderate box office success, grossing over US$56 million worldwide, but was heavily panned by critics and audiences, Her next seven screen projects —the films Big Sur, Olympus Has Fallen, Evidence, The Frozen Ground, Standing Up, Expecting and the ABC drama series Red Widow— were released throughout 2013. Olympus Has Fallen, in which she portrayed a nurse and the wife of a Secret Service agent, proved to be her most successful film of the year, grossing US$170.3 million globally, and spawning a film trilogy. In Fugly! (2014), a comedy written by and starring John Leguizamo, Mitchell played a neurotic uptown girl and the love interest of an unattractive man rejected by women because of his donkey-faced appearance.

In Looking for Grace (2015), a drama screened in the main competition section of the 72nd Venice International Film Festival, Mitchell starred as a mother hiring a private detective in an attempt to find her missing daughter. Her comic portrayal was hailed as "amusingly tetchy" by Variety and "well-tuned" by Time Out Sydney.

In 2016, Mitchell returned to the Fallen trilogy in London Has Fallen, which made US$205.9 million, and took on the roles of the matriarch of a family who brings home a supernatural force from the Grand Canyon in the horror film The Darkness, an obstetrician living in the remote Shetland Islands in the thriller Sacrifice, as well as that of one half of a couple in the short film Whoever Was Using This Bed. The Christian drama The Shack (2017), which featured Mitchell as a devoutly religious wife, opened with US$16.1 million in North America, finishing above expectations.  It eventually earned US$96.9 million worldwide.

Filmography

Film

Television

Awards and nominations

See also

References

External links

 

1973 births
20th-century Australian actresses
21st-century Australian actresses
Actresses from Melbourne
Australian child actresses
Australian film actresses
Australian television actresses
Living people
People educated at St Michael's Grammar School
Swinburne University of Technology alumni